Polygyra cereolus is a species of air-breathing land snail, a terrestrial pulmonate gastropod mollusk in the family Polygyridae.

Subspecies 
 Polygyra cereolus floridana

References

External links
 Polygyra cereolus  on the UF / IFAS Featured Creatures Web site

Polygyridae